Laura Lynn (born 18 June 1976) is a Belgian singer, based in Flanders. Her real name is Sabrina Tack and she is known as the "Queen of Schlager".

She has had, four number-one songs on the Flanders Ultratop 50:
 "Jij bent de mooiste" in 2006
 "Kom Dans met Mij" in 2007, with Frans Bauer
 "Dans de hele nacht met mij", also in 2007
 "Al duurt de nacht tot morgenvroeg" in 2008, again with Bauer

External links
 Official website

Living people
1976 births
Schlager musicians
21st-century Belgian women singers
21st-century Belgian singers